Zygeupolia is a genus of nemerteans belonging to the family Lineidae.

The species of this genus are found in Northern America.

Species:

Zygeupolia rubens 
Zygeupolia rufa

References

Lineidae
Nemertea genera